The Nashik District Maratha Vidya Prasarak Samaj Maratha Vidya prasarak Samaj's Karmaveer Baburao Ganpatrao Thakare College of Engineering is an Engineering school. It was established in 1999 on 7.5 acres in the heart of Nashik city.

Facilities
The College is affiliated to Pune University. The College has laboratories, a workshop and a hostel. Every department has separate computational facilities along with LAN, internet and necessary software.

Departments
The college provides four year courses leading to bachelor's degree of University of Pune in the following disciplines :

 Information Technology - intake - 60
 Computer Engineering - intake - 60
 Mechanical Engineering - intake - 120
 Civil Engineering - intake - 60
 Instrumentation and Control Engineering - intake - 40
 Electronic and Telecommunication Engineering - intake - 60
 Post Graduate Degree in Business Administration - intake - 60
 Post Graduate Degree in Masters in Computer Applications - intake - 60
 Post Graduate Degree in Engineering,M.E.(Construction Management) - intake - 24
 Post Graduate Degree in Engineering,M.E.(Mechanical Engineering Design) - intake - 24

Location
The College is located at about 2.5 km from central Bus stand off Ganagapur Road/ 1 km straight from Vihar hotel, It occupies 10 acres of land within the Udoji Maratha Boarding compound.

References

Engineering colleges in Maharashtra
Education in Nashik
Colleges affiliated to Savitribai Phule Pune University
Educational institutions established in 1999
1999 establishments in Karnataka